The 2011 Hong Kong Tennis Classic was held on 5–8 January.
In 2011, there are four Zonal groups of three players; Team Americas, Team Asia-Pacific, Team Europe and Team Russia.  Two teams play against each other in a semifinal, with three singles ties (amongst the three players) and 1 doubles tie.  The two winning teams progress to the Gold Group final, playing for 1st and 2nd, whilst the losing teams progress to the Silver Group final, playing off for 3rd and 4th.

2011 Teams

Draw

Gold Froup Final: Team Europe vs. Team Russia
Venue : Centre Court, Victoria Park, Hong Kong
Surface : Outdoor Hardcourt

See also
 Hong Kong Tennis Classic

External links
 Official website

Tennis tournaments in Hong Kong
2011 tennis exhibitions
2011 in Hong Kong sport
2011 in Chinese tennis
2011 in Hong Kong women's sport